Vairāgya (वैराग्य) is a Sanskrit term used in Hindu as well as Eastern philosophy that roughly translates as dispassion, detachment, or renunciation, in particular renunciation from the pains and pleasures in the temporary material world. The Hindu philosophers who advocated vairāgya told their followers that it is a means to achieve moksha.

True vairāgya refers to an internal state of mind rather than to external lifestyle and can be practiced equally well by one engaged in family life and career as it can be by a renunciate. Vairāgya does not mean suppression of or developing repulsion for material objects. By the application of vivek (spiritual discrimination or discernment) to life experience, the aspirant gradually develops a strong attraction for the inner spiritual source of fulfillment and happiness and limited attachments fall away naturally. Balance is maintained between the inner spiritual state and one's external life through the practice of seeing all limited entities as expressions of the one Cosmic Consciousness or Brahman.

Etymology
Vairāgya is an abstract noun derived from the word virāga (joining vi meaning "without" + rāga meaning "passion, feeling, emotion, interest"). This gives vairāgya a general meaning of "ascetic disinterest" in things that would cause attachment in most people. It is a "dis-passionate" stance on life. An ascetic who has subdued all passions and desires is called a vairāgika.
Further etymological definition indicates the root rańj, referring to colour: Vi – rańj + ghaiṋ = virága. The state of virága is vaerágya. Virága means "to go beyond colour" or "to be uncoloured". To remain completely engaged in the world yet uncoloured by the world is called vaerágya.

A practitioner of vairagya is called a vairagi.

Hinduism
The concept of Vairāgya is found in the Yoga Sūtras of Patañjali, where it, along with practice (abhyāsa), is the key to restraint of the modifications of the mind (YS 1.12, "abhyāsa-vairāgyabhyāṁ tannirodhaḥ"). The term vairāgya appears three times in the Bhagavad Gita (6.35, 13.8, 18.52) where it is recommended as a key means for bringing control to the restless mind. It is also the main topic of Mokṣopāya or Yoga-Vāsiṣṭha. The mind runs to places it has been habituated to run to the past, without attachment we are freed from this point of view of an wandering mind. Non-attachment means dispassion towards the world. The supreme goal of enlightenment is one that requires self-sacrifice, its a difficult task and the state is very difficult to attain with death being the final test, this suggests detachment. The bodisatva is one who restrains the senses, sacrificing all the attraction and aversion, abandoning aside the sounds and sights of the sense organs that would cause attachment. Krishna tells Arjuna that acting with detachment means doing the right thing for its own sake, because it needs to be done, without worrying about success or failure. Krishna says to Arjuna not to give up upon doing his best because its what destiny demands of him to perform his best with his role, his destiny is his continued good performance of his role, the detachment is in not being impassioned by the feelings associated in living with continued awareness of success and failure because both are irrelevant. Treating in equal measure, happiness and distress, loss and gain, victory and success. Detachment may mean treating these agitating, distressing or perturbing dichotomies in an equal sense. Arjuna must do his duty without apprehension and loss by being without attachment to the fruits of his actions. Arjuna is told if he fights with equanimity, treating those outcomes as the same he will not accumulate bad karma. If one sacrifices their selfish motives and works merely to fulfill his or her duty towards the supreme his work and thus been alleviated of any karmic reactions. 

Another important text on renunciation is Vairāgya śataka or "100 verses of Renunciation", a part of the Śatakatraya collection by Bhartṛhari.

Jainism
Vairāgya (वैराग्य, “detachment”) according to the 2nd-century Tattvārthasūtra 7.12.—What is meant by detachment (vairāgya)? To develop disinterest towards the subjects of the sensual and physical pleasures is detachment.

Aversion leading to renunciation; The non-attachment to sense pleasures

See also
 Epoché
 Equanimity

Sources

References

Hindu philosophical concepts
Hindu asceticism
Jain philosophical concepts 
Moksha
Jain practices